Billy McGregor (20 November 1876 – 9 August 1919) was an Australian rules footballer who played with St Kilda in the Victorian Football League (VFL).

References

External links 		
		

1876 births
1919 deaths
Australian rules footballers from Melbourne
St Kilda Football Club players
Port Melbourne Football Club players
People from Williamstown, Victoria